Aaron Jeoffrey Benward (born September 13, 1973) is an American singer-songwriter, actor, film/TV producer and music supervisor.

Life and career
Benward is the son of Candice and Jeoffrey Benward and has two siblings, Sareece and Colin. In high school, he left his mark as an All-State football, basketball and soccer player and was named the U.S. Army Scholar/Athlete of the Year. After graduating, he decided to pursue a college degree before getting involved in music on a professional level. He attended college on a soccer scholarship studying music business at Belmont University in Nashville, Tennessee.

In 1991, he surprised his father Jeoffrey when he told his dad that he wanted to follow his steps in the music business. They went on to form a unique son/father duo called Aaron Jeoffrey that achieved great success in the CCM scene. They garnered 10 #1 Billboard CCM singles and sold over 1,000,000 copies on all three of their EMI released albums combined.

Aaron met his wife, Kenda, in San Jose, California, and married in 1994.  They have three children named Luke 25, Gracie 23 and Ella 19.

In the late 1990s, Aaron decided to pursue a solo career. While recording his first solo album, Aaron, his wife and children, were involved in a near fatal car accident. After recovering from his injuries, Mr. Benward was able to release his debut album titled Imagine, that had Billboard #1 single called "Captured" in 2000.

Benward then founded the country music duo Blue County with his friend Scott Reeves. Blue County recorded one album for Curb Records, which included the top 10 single "Good Little Girls"and the Top 20 hit "That's Cool" which Aaron co-wrote.  Blue County was also nominated three times for CMA/ACM Duo of the Year.  They participated as a featured artist in Conde Nast's/Chevrolet's Fashion Rocks campaign.

In 2009, Aaron, co-created a live show in Las Vegas called "Nashville Unplugged: The Story Behind the Song", that features hit songwriters from all genres in a back porch, songwriter in the round style show made famous at the Bluebird Cafe in Nashville, Tn. The audience is able to get a sneak peek behind the curtain of how hit songs are born and then performed by those very songwriters.  The show is often referred to as a cross between VH1's Storytellers and Inside the Actors Studio for songwriters.  "Nashville Unplugged" is 11 years running and currently plays every Friday night at 8 PM in Las Vegas at Mandalay Bay Hotel and Casino.  Aaron has continued the growth of this show into other casinos and markets around the country including Los Angeles, Reno, Boise, Laughlin, Oregon, Washington, Pennsylvania, Texas and California.

In July 2021, Aaron and Jimmie Allen started JAB Entertainment where they signed the first black and white duo in country music history called Neon Union.  Andrew Millsaps and Leo Brooks just recently made history by being the first black and white duo to ever step inside the hallowed circle of the Grand Ole Opry.  You can catch Neon Union as the opening act for Jimmie on his Down Home Tour in 2022.  Neon Union signed their first record deal in June 2022. 

In March 2012 til March 2014,  Aaron moved his creative forces and his family to Los Angeles and signed a new exclusive music publishing deal with Cornman Music/Warner Chappell where he had numerous songs placed on shows like ABC's "Nashville" and Bravo's "Project Runway".  In May 2015, Aaron co-wrote and co-produced the theme song and end title for Walt Disney's "Monkey Kingdom" called "It's our World" performed by Atlantic Records artist Jacquie Lee.  Since December 2015, Aaron has co-written 15 songs that have been recorded by some of the biggest recording artists in JPOP and KPOP music such as EXO, Namie Amuro, AOA, Taeyeon, Taemin and Red Velvet with 9 of those songs becoming big hits in SE ASIA.  Those hits include "Sing for You" and "For Life" by EXO, "Rain" and "Make Me Love You" by Taeyeon, "Good Luck" by AOA, "Soldier" and "Rise" by Taemin and "Dear Diary" by Namie Amuro.   Currently, Aaron has had 20 songs in the hit Netflix series "The Ranch" starring Ashton Kutcher, Sam Elliott and Debra Winger.

Recently, Aaron has taken his talents to the silver screen by starring in 3 films called "Acts of God", "The Song" and "Past Due".  "The Song" was picked up by Metro-Goldwyn and released in September 2014.  It is a modern-day story of King Solomon but told in the context of country music.  Aaron plays David King, who is an iconic, outlaw country artist, a la Waylon Jennings type.  His son, Jed, follows in his footsteps only to find that he must break the curse in order for his life to turn out better than his daddy had it.
In "Acts of God", Aaron plays a US Army Ranger who comes back from combat with P.T.S.D. and the story follows how he handles this difficulty and how it affects his family, career and relationships.

Aaron is a partner in Watershed Motion Pictures and has recently released their first feature film called “Playing God” starring Luke Benward, Michael McKean, Alan Tudyk, Marc Menchaca and Jude Demorest. Www.watershedmotionpictures.com. Watershed is currently in post-production on their latest feature called Chasing Oslo. Chasing Oslo stars Jordan Fisher as Oslo Green, the world's largest influencer who unplugs from his platform and causes his biggest fan, Jovi Yates, to head out on a journey to find him.  Her estranged best friend, Britt and her brother, document Jovi's journey in hopes that it is good enough to get Britt into NYU Film School but it becomes much more than an entrance film to college for Britt.
Aaron is also a creator and Executive Producer of the new sports gambling talk show called The DeGentlemen Show shot live at Mandalay Bay Hotel and Casino in Las Vegas. 
He finished principal photography on “Quiet in My Town” on October 24, 2019 in Thomasville, Ga, which is an independent feature film that pulls back the secrets of a small town.  It's due to be released in 2021.
Aaron and Watershed have recently partnered with Jared Goetz of Ascending Media Group and John Bryan of JB and Associates to represent their latest project called God Family Football which is a new Docu-series that follows the Evangel Christian Academy football program in Shreveport, LA and their football coach and pastor, Denny Duron.  The show will start shooting in September 2022 and be aired on Freevee in February 2023.

Luke Benward
In 1995, Aaron and Kenda had a son, Luke, who grew up in his father's footsteps, starring in various films including We Were Soldiers with Mel Gibson, Because of Winn-Dixie, How to Eat Fried Worms, and Dear John with Channing Tatum. He also appears in Field of Lost Shoes (2014), Life of the Party, Dumplin' and Measure of a Man (all 2018).

On TV, Luke was featured on Family Affair, the ABC Family series Ravenswood, and the Disney Channel series Good Luck Charlie and Girl Meets World. He also starred in some of the Disney Channel Original Movies, Minutemen, Girl vs. Monster and Cloud 9.

Kenda Benward
Aaron's wife is an actress as well.  She was the first on-air personality for CMT when she hosted a show called "Hit Trip".  She has starred in numerous films like "Adrenaline" and the fiancé of Michael W. Smith in The Second Chance.  She played Emily Osment's mom in Disney Channel's "Dadnapped" as well as Dove Cameron's mom also in Disney's "Cloud 9".  In 2015, she portrayed a jealous, murdering wife in CSI.   She is also a highly sought after acting coach who has coached likes of Miley Cyrus, Olivia Holt, Kimberly Williams-Paisley, and her own son, Luke Benward.  She worked alongside Taylor Hackford in the Oscar-winning film "Ray" as the on set acting coach for C.J Sanders who played "Young Ray Charles" and had never acted before.

Other work

See also
 Aaron Jeoffrey 
 Blue County

References

1973 births
American country singer-songwriters
American male singer-songwriters
American performers of Christian music
Place of birth missing (living people)
Blue County (duo) members
Living people
Singer-songwriters from Tennessee
Members of the Country Music Association
Country musicians from Tennessee
21st-century American male singers
21st-century American singers